Neon is a chemical element with symbol Ne and atomic number 10.

Neon or NEON may also refer to:

Lighting
 Neon lighting, broad discussion of technologies and uses
 Neon sign,  luminous-tube signs that contain neon or other inert gases
 Neon lamp, miniature gas discharge lamp

Classical antiquity
Neon (classical antiquity), the name of a number of figures from Greek and Roman history
Neon (Phocis), a town of ancient Phocis, Greece

Biology
 Neon tetra, a fish species
 Neon (spider), a genus of jumping spiders
 Neamine transaminase, an enzyme
 Neomycin C transaminase, an enzyme

Television
 Neon, a Finnish television show by FST5
 Neon, a station ident for British television channel BBC Two from the 1991–2001 idents
 Neon (service), a streaming platform owned by New Zealand satellite television company Sky TV

Comics
Neon the Unknown, a comic-book superhero

Companies and organizations
 National Ecological Observatory Network NEON, a project of the U.S. National Science Foundation
 Neon Bus, a low-fare bus line operated by Greyhound Lines serving New York City, Toronto, Syracuse, and Buffalo
 Network of European Observatories in the North (NEON), discoverer of minor planets
 The NEON, a cinema venue in Newport, Wales
 Neon (company), an American film distributor founded in 2017

Computing
 NEON (instruction set) an extension for the ARM instruction set with SIMD
 An object oriented variant of the Forth programming language
 Neon (game engine), developed by Codemasters
 Neon (light synthesizer), developed by Jeff Minter
 Neon, a configuration format for PHP within the Nette Framework

Music
 N.E.O.N., acronym for Nevada Encounters of New Music, a symposium and festival of contemporary music

Bands
 Neon (Australian band), an Australian band
 Neon (British band), a new wave band
 Neon, a Belgian new beat project in the 1980s
Neon Neon, a musical collaboration between Boom Bip and Gruff Rhys

Albums
 Neon (Chris Young album)
 Neon (Erra album)
 Neon (Jay Sean album)
 Neon (Richard Fleeshman album)
 Neon (EP), an EP by Versa
 Neon, a 1967 album by The Cyrkle
 Neon, a 2018 album by Boris Titulaer
 The Neon (album), a 2020 album by Erasure

Songs
 "Neon" (Chris Young song), 2012
 "Neon" (John Mayer song), 2001
 "Neon (Lonely People)", a 2013 song by Lena Meyer-Landrut
 "Neon", a 2010 song by Ash
 "Neon", a 2006 song by Clearlake
 "Neon", a 2015 song by Kim Jonghyun
 "Neon", a 2019 song by Yukika Teramoto

Other uses
Chrysler/Dodge/Plymouth Neon, a compact car
Neon (dancer), American dancer, dance instructor, and choreographer
Neon (magazine), a British film quarterly 1996–1999
Neon relish, Chicago hot dog accompaniment

See also

 Ne (disambiguation)
 Neo (disambiguation)
 NeoN
 Isotopes of neon